Clermont was a 17th-century French mathematician and military engineer. His book about practical geometry, La geometrie pratique de l'ingenieur, ou L'art de mesurer (1693), was a reference work reprinted for 60 years.

Clermont served in the French Army as artillery commissary.

Works

References 

17th-century births
18th-century deaths
17th-century French mathematicians
French engineers
Military engineers